, known professionally as , is a Japanese voice actress, narrator, author and singer from Chiba. She has been part of the singing group Goddess Family Club. Tōma once worked for Aoni Production before she founded her own agency ALLURE&Y. Because of her mature voice, she often plays strong and beautiful women. Tōma is married to Toei Company producer Tatsuya Yoshida.

Voice roles

TV animation
Dragon Ball (–87) – Girl (ep. 28), Young Girl (ep. 45), Boy (ep. 79)
City Hunter 2 – Misa Williams (eps. 17–18)
Dragon Ball Z – Attendant (ep. 14), Rom (ep. 16)
Dragon Quest: The Adventure of Dai (1991) – Gome-chan
Mobile Suit Victory Gundam (1993) – Kalinga Wogel, Elena
Miracle Girls (1993) – Emma Winston (Second)
Sailor Moon R – Ann / Natsumi Ginga
Tonde Burin (1994) – Buritī Koizumi
Magic Knight Rayearth (1994) – young Ferio, Hasegawa-senpai
Fushigi Yūgi (1995) – Yui Hongo, Tama
Mobile Suit Gundam Wing (1995) – Mrs. Dorian, Sally Po
Detective Conan (1996) – Hitomi Sasaki, Nao Takiguchi
City Hunter: Goodbye My Sweetheart – Opera Member A
Clamp School Detectives (1997) – Itsuki
Pokémon (1997) – Satsuki
Adventures of Mini-Goddess (1998) – Urd
Cowboy Bebop (1998) – Wen
Yu-Gi-Oh! (1998) – Kaoruko Himekoji (first series only), Shimizu
Cardcaptor Sakura (1999) – Spinel Sun
Inuyasha (2002) – Toran
Air (2005) – Hijiri Kirishima
Ah! My Goddess (2005) – Urd
Emma – A Victorian Romance (2005) – Emma
Emma – A Victorian Romance: Second Act (2007) – Emma
Natsuyuki Rendezvous (2012) – Miho Shimao
Altair: A Record of Battles (2017) – Nilüfer Fatma
Fist of the Blue Sky: Regenesis (2018) – Pān Yù-Líng
Kaginado (2021–22) – Hijiri Kirishima

Unknown date
.hack//Sign – Helba
21 Emon – Luna
After War Gundam X – Særia Sou
Angelique ~Kokoro no Mezameru Toki~ – Mel
Alice SOS – Yukari Ashikawa
Atashin'chi – English Teacher
Baby Felix – young Felix
Beyblade – Dr. Judy Mizuhara
Black Jack 21 – Benitokage
Boyfriend – Megumi Hanyu
Brain Powerd – Nakki Gaizu
The Brave of Gold Goldran – Lady Licca The Legendra
The Brave Fighter of Legend Da-Garn – Yamamoto Pink, Lady Pinkie, Magical Pinkie
Cinderella Boy – Rela Cindy Shirayuki
Cho Mashin Hero Wataru – Phoenix of Flame
Cooking Papa – Yumeko Kimura, Bei, Chie, Kūgo Nekota
Doraemon – Natsumi Gotō
Esper Mami – Chiaki, Chisato, Children, Boy
Firestorm  – Gina
Flint the Time Detective – T.P. Lady.
Jikū Tantei Genshi-kun – TP Lady/Akira Aino
Gokinjo Monogatari – Mariko Nakasu
Girls und Panzer – Shiho Nishizumi
Gun Frontier – Yoneko
Hero Bank – Momiji Murayama
High School Mystery: Gakuen Nanafushigi – Fumiko Shirahata
Hime-chan's Ribbon – Yuka Hijiri
Himitsu no Akko-chan – Fujiko-sensei, Kyoko Tanaka
Jormungand – Chiquita
Jushin Liger – Sanae, Aki
Kamisama Kazoku  – Misa Kamiyama
Karakuri Zōshi Ayatsuri Sakon – Hazuki Funabashi
Kirby: Right Back at Ya! – Rōrin-sensei
Kiteretsu Daihyakka – Otonashi (Second), Namiyo, Telephone's Voice
Kokoro Library – Rie Mochima
Kurokami: The Animation – Punipuni, Shinobu Nanase
Lost Universe – Stella
Madō King Granzort – Taka
Magical Tarurūto-kun – Iyona Kawai
Mama wa Shōgaku 4 Nensei – Minako Yamaguchi
Master Keaton – Natalia-Sensei
Mobile Fighter G Gundam – Princess Maria Louise
Monkey Turn – Aki Koike
Moyashimon – Aspergillius oryzae
Najica Blitz Tactics – Hiiragi Najika
Neighborhood Story – Mariko Nakasu, Kuro
Noir – Silvana Greone
Phoenix – Tamami
Pitaten – Nyaa
Pokémon: Advanced Generation – Mitsuko
Porphy no Nagai Tabi – Romane
Powerpuff Girls Z – Kinosaki-sensei
Remi, Nobody's Girl – Arthur
Romeo's Blue Skies – Hanna
Saint Seiya – Young Shun, Hyoga and Akira
Sazae-san – Kayo
School Rumble ni Gakki – Iori the cat in episode 21
s-CRY-ed – Banka
Shinkai Densetsu Meremanoid – Misty Jo
Slayers – Sylphiel Nels Lahda
Steel Angel Kurumi – Michael
Super Robot Wars Original Generation: Divine Wars – Aya Kobayashi
The Laughing Salesman – Asako Kariya
The Wallflower – Sayuri
The World of Narue – Haruna
Transformers: Super-God Masterforce – Go Shooter
Turn A Gundam – Teleth Halleh, Linda Halleh
The Twelve Kingdoms – Ren Rin
xxxHOLiC Kei – Jorougumo
Xenosaga: The Animation – Nephilim
Yawara! A Fashionable Judo Girl – Kyōko Hikage (Kyon Kyon)
Yumeiro Patissiere – Harue Kirishima

ONA
Tekken: Bloodline (2022) – Nina Williams

OVA
Bubblegum Crisis (1988, 1990) – Interviewer (ep. 5), Lou (ep. 7)
Super Mario's Fire Brigade (1989) – Tetsuya
Record of Lodoss War (1990) – Deedlit
Detonator Orgun (1991) – Michi Kanzaki
Ninja Ryūkenden (1991) – Irene Lew
The Super Dimension Fortress Macross II: Lovers, Again (1992) – Silvie Gena
Ushio & Tora (1992) – Mayuko Inoue
Oh My Goddess! (1993) – Urd, Belldandy (child)
Robot Hunter Casshern (1993) – Luna Kamizuki
Please Save My Earth (1993) – Rin Kobayashi
Maps (1994) – Lipumira Gweiss
Iczer Girl Iczelion (1994) – Nami Shiina
Galaxy Fraulein Yuna (1995) – Polylina
Voltage Fighter Gowcaizer (1996) – Shaia Hishizaki
Tekken: The Motion Picture (1998) – Jun Kazama
Street Fighter Zero: The Animation (1999) – Chun-Li

Unknown date
Fushigi Yūgi – Yui Hongo
Futari Ecchi – Kyōko Ōmiya
Future GPX Cyber Formula – Clair Fortlan
Halo Legends – Cortana (Origins)
Inferious Wakusei Senshi Gaiden Condition Green  – Bernie Page, Candy
Interlude – Haruka Tonobe
Pichu and Pikachu – Pichu
Power Dolls: Omuni Senki 2540 – Yao Feilun
Ranma ½ – Hinako Ninomiya
Re: Cutie Honey – Black Claw
Super Robot Wars Original Generation: The Animation – Aya Kobayashi
Tales of Symphonia – Raine Sage
Tenchi Muyo! – Tokimi

Movies
Saint Seiya: Evil Goddess Eris – Akira
City Hunter: Bay City Wars – News Caster
City Hunter: Million Dollar Conspiracy – Hinako
Mobile Suit Gundam F91 – Cecily Fairchild
Pretty Soldier Sailor Moon R: The Movie – Xenian Flower
Neighborhood Story – Mariko Nakasu
Pocket Monsters the Movie: Revelation Lugia – Freezer
New Mobile Report Gundam Wing: Endless Waltz – Sally Po
Ah! My Goddess: The Movie – Urd
Air – Hijiri Kirishima
Girls und Panzer der Film – Shiho Nishizumi

Video games

Hellfire S: The Another Story – Kaoru Togo
Lady Phantom – Cindy Matsunaga
Sol-Feace – Misao Hatataka
Cosmic Fantasy 3: Bōken Shōnen Rei – Mai
Tekken – Nina Williams, Anna Williams
Tekken 2 – Nina Williams, Anna Williams
Doki Doki Pretty League – Mayumi Asai
Eberouge – Castele Andalsia
Langrisser I & II – Narm
Tekken Tag Tournament – Ling Xiaoyu, Nina Williams, Anna Williams 
Tekken 4 – Ling Xiaoyu
Tekken Advance – Ling Xiaoyu, Nina Williams
Castlevania: Lament of Innocence – Sara Trantoul
Jak II: Renegade – Tess (Japanese dub)
Xenoaga Episode II: Jenseits von Gut und Böse – Nephilim
Mobile Suit Gundam SEED: Owaranai Ashita e – Jane Houston
Dead or Alive Xtreme 2 – Leifang
Tekken 6 – Ling Xiaoyu
Dead or Alive: Paradise – Leifang
Tekken 3D: Prime Edition – Ling Xiaoyu
Sonic Lost World – Zeena

Unknown date
Air – Hijiri Kirishima
Angelique Etoile – Mel
Angelique Special 2 – Mel, the fortuneteller
Angelique Trois – Mel
Bōkoku no Aegis 2035: Warship Gunner – Satomi Kikumasa
Device Reign – Yuri Saeki
Exodus Guilty Neos – Rirīnu, Reiruru
Farland Story: Yotsu no Fūin – Elenore
Galaxy Fräulein Yuna – Liabert von Neuestein, Yoko Mizuno
Granblue Fantasy – Heles
Hataraku Shōjo: Tekipaki Workin' Love – Pāpkin Naomi Koshigaya
Interlude – Haruka Tonobe
Jak 3 – Tess (Japanese dub)
Jak X: Combat Racing – Tess (Japanese dub)
Kono Yo no Hate de Koi wo Utau Shōjo YU-NO – Mio Shimazu
Marvel: Ultimate Alliance – Elektra, Enchantress (Japanese dub)
Marvel: Ultimate Alliance 2 – Jean Grey (Japanese dub)
Mitsumete Knight – Raizze Haimer, Luna
Next King: Koi no Sennen Ōkoku – Chamomile Artichoke
Policenauts – Anna Brown
Power Dolls 2 – Anita Sheffield
Power Dolls FX – Yao Feilun
Puyo Puyo CD – Rulue
Radiata Stories – Valkyrie
Senkutsu Katsuryū Taisen Chaos Seed – Wan Sōgen, Kō Meihon
The Legend of Heroes II: Prophecy of the Moonlight Witch (Sega Saturn version) – Sharla, Stella
Sotsugyō series – Reiko Takashiro
Star Ocean: Till the End of Time – Lenneth
Super Chase Criminal Termination – Nancy
Super Robot Wars series – Aya Kobayashi, Cecily Fairchild, Vera Rona
Tactics Ogre – Kachua Powell
Trauma Center: New Blood – Valerie Baylock
Vampire Hunter D – Charlotte
Valkyrie Profile – Lenneth Valkyrie, Platina
Ys IV: The Dawn of Ys – Karna

Drama CDs
Unknown date
Dengeki CD Bunko EX Vampire ~Night Warriors~ – Morrigan Aensland
Dengeki CD Bunko ~ Best Game Selection 13 ~ The King of Fighters '94 – King
Samurai Shodown Dengeki drama CD series – Charlotte Christine de Colde
Fushigi Yūgi Genbu Kaiden – Rimudo's mother
Inferious Wakusei Senshi Gaiden Condition Green – Bernie Page, Candy
Kamaitachi no Yoru Drama CD (Mari
Madara Tenshōhen – Fukuhime Kirin 
Popful Mail The Next Generation – Gaw
Popful Mail Paradise – Gaw
Street Fighter II Drama CD – Chun-Li
Tales of Symphonia: Drama CD Vol.2 – Raine Sage
TARAKO Pappara Paradise – Gaw
Zombie-ya Reiko – Saki Yurikawa

Dubbing

Live-action
2 Days in the Valley – Becky Foxx (Teri Hatcher)
24 – Sarah Warner (Sarah Wynter)
10,000 BC (2011 TV Asahi version) – Evolet (Camilla Belle)
American Graffiti (2011 Blu-Ray edition) – Laurie Henderson (Cindy Williams)
Baby's Day Out – Gilbertine (Cynthia Nixon)
Brokedown Palace – Alice (Claire Daines)
Casino Royale (TV Asahi version) – Vesper Lynd (Eva Green)
Charmed – Piper Halliwell (Holly Marie Combs)
Contagion – Lenora Orantes (Marion Cotillard)
Crazy Heart – Jean Craddock (Maggie Gyllenhaal)
CSI: Crime Scene Investigation – Sofia Curtis (Louise Lombard)
Dark Angel (DVD version) – Max Guevera (Jessica Alba)
Final Destination (2002 TV Asahi edition) – Clear Rivers (Ali Larter)
Final Destination 2 (2006 TV Tokyo edition) – Clear Rivers (Ali Larter)
Genius – Olga Khokhlova (Sofia Doniants)
Goodbye Christopher Robin – Daphne de Sélincourt (Margot Robbie)
Growing Pains – Carol Seaver (Tracey Gold)
Inception (2012 TV Asahi version) – Mal Cobb (Marion Cotillard)
Iron Man 2 (2012 TV Asahi version) – Natasha Romanova / Black Widow (Scarlett Johansson)
Jackie Brown – Melanie Ralston (Bridget Fonda)
Kiss of Death – Kay Rousseau (Louise Lombard)
Ladder 49 – Linda Morrison
Lights Out – Sophie (Maria Bello)
Mad Men – Betty Draper (January Jones)
Magnolia – Stanley Spector (Jeremy Blackman)
Project Runway – Nina García
Ray Donovan – Abby Donovan (Paula Malcomson)
Shinjuku Incident – Xiu Xiu / Yuko Eguchi (Xu Jinglei)
The Gift – Jessica King (Katie Holmes)
The Golden Compass (TV Asahi version) – Serafina Pekkala (Eva Green)
The Invasion – Carol Bennell (Nicole Kidman)
The West Wing – Katie Witt (Kris Murphy)
The Young Victoria – Harriet Sutherland (Rachel Stirling)
Third Watch – Sgt. Maritza Cruz (Tia Texada)
Titanic (2003 Nippon TV version) – Rose (Kate Winslet)
Who Am I? (TV Tokyo version) – Christine Stark (Michelle Ferre)
Young Sheldon – Mary Cooper (Zoe Perry)
Zoey's Extraordinary Playlist – Maggie Clarke (Mary Steenburgen)

Animation
Encanto – Julieta Madrigal
Happy Feet – Norma Jean
Moomins on the Riviera – Audrey Glamour
Charlotte's Web 2: Wilbur's Great Adventure – Nellie
Stressed Eric – Liz Feeble, Mrs Perfect, Various

Bibliography
 Oh My Goddess! -First End- (2006 Japanese) , (2007 English translation)

References

Further reading
 Nakagami, Yoshikatsu. "The Official Art of AIR". (October 2007) Newtype USA. pp. 135–141.

External links
 Official website 
 

1966 births
Living people
Voice actors from Chiba (city)
Voice actresses from Chiba Prefecture
Japanese voice actresses
Japanese video game actresses
20th-century Japanese actresses
20th-century Japanese women singers
20th-century Japanese singers
21st-century Japanese actresses
21st-century Japanese women singers
21st-century Japanese singers
Aoni Production voice actors